The Wisconsin State Assembly elections of 2022 were held on Tuesday, November 8, 2022.  All 99 seats in the Wisconsin State Assembly were up for election.  This was the first election to take place after redistricting following the 2020 United States census. Before the election, 61 Assembly seats were held by Republicans and 38 seats were held by Democrats.  The primary election was held on August 9, 2022.

Republicans flipped three Democratic-held Assembly seats but failed to achieve a two-thirds supermajority, entering the 106th Wisconsin Legislature with 64 of 99 State Assembly seats.

Elected members took office on January 3, 2023.

Results summary

Close races
Seats where the margin of victory was under 10%:
  (gain) 
  (gain)  
   
  
  (gain)

Outgoing incumbents

Retiring
 Gary Tauchen (R–Bonduel), representing District 6, did not run for re-election.
 Joe Sanfelippo (R–New Berlin), representing District 15, did not run for re-election.
 Gary Hebl (D–Sun Prairie, representing District 46, did not run for re-election.
 Jeremy Thiesfeldt (R–Fond du Lac), representing District 52, did not run for re-election.
 Gordon Hintz (D–Oshkosh), representing District 54, did not run for re-election.
 Nick Milroy (D–South Range), representing District 73, did not run for re-election.
 Beth Meyers (D–Bayfield), representing District 74, did not run for re-election.
 Sondy Pope (D–Mount Horeb), representing District 80, did not run for re-election.
 Ken Skowronski (R–Franklin), representing District 82, did not run for re-election.

Vacated
 Jim Steineke (R–Vandenbroek), representing District 5, resigned from office in July 2022.
 Tyler Vorpagel (R–Plymouth), representing District 27, resigned in June 2022.
 Samantha Kerkman (R–Salem Lakes), representing District 61, resigned in June 2022 to serve as Kenosha County executive.
 Mike Kuglitsch (R–New Berlin), representing District 84, resigned in May 2022.

Seeking other office
 David Bowen (D–Milwaukee), representing District 10, ran for the Democratic nomination for Lieutenant Governor, but then withdrew before the primary.
 Sara Rodriguez (D–Brookfield), representing District 13, won the Democratic nomination for Lieutenant Governor.
 Jonathan Brostoff (D–Milwaukee), representing District 19, was elected to Milwaukee city council.
 Amy Loudenbeck (R–Clinton), representing District 31, ran for Wisconsin Secretary of State.
 Cody Horlacher (R–Mukwonago), representing District 33, intends to run for Wisconsin circuit court judge in 2023.
 Mark Spreitzer (D–Beloit), representing District 45, was elected to the Wisconsin State Senate.
 Rachael Cabral-Guevara (R–Fox Crossing), representing District 55, was elected to the Wisconsin State Senate.
 Timothy Ramthun (R–Campbellsport), representing District 59, ran for Governor of Wisconsin.
 Jesse James (R–Altoona), representing District 68, was elected to the Wisconsin State Senate.
 Dianne Hesselbein (D–Middleton), representing District 79, was elected to the Wisconsin State Senate.

Election results

Predictions

See also
 Republican efforts to restrict voting following the 2020 presidential election: Wisconsin
 2022 Wisconsin elections
 2022 Wisconsin gubernatorial election
 2022 Wisconsin Attorney General election
 2022 Wisconsin State Senate election
 2022 United States House of Representatives elections in Wisconsin
 2022 United States elections
 Wisconsin State Assembly
 Elections in Wisconsin
 Redistricting in Wisconsin

References

External links
 Wisconsin Elections Commission
 
 
 
  (State affiliate of the U.S. League of Women Voters)
 

Wisconsin State Assembly
State Assembly
2022